Bidlu (also Romanized as Bīdlū; also known as Qeshlāq-e Bīdlū) is a village in Khoshkrud Rural District, in the Central District of Zarandieh County, Markazi Province, Iran. At the 2006 census, its population was 216, in 43 families.

References 

Populated places in Zarandieh County